A Wives' Tale is a Canadian documentary film, directed by Sophie Bissonnette, Martin Duckworth and Joyce Rock and released in 1980. The film explores the role of women in the community during the 1978 Inco strike, when a nine-month strike at INCO's mining operations in Sudbury, Ontario decimated the local economy.

The film won the Prix de la critique québécoise from the Association québécoise des critiques de cinéma in 1981, although the filmmakers did not receive the traditional prize money as the Quebec Film Institute had opted to discontinue funding the award without informing the AQCC. The film was also a Genie Award nominee for Best Theatrical Documentary at the 2nd Genie Awards in 1981.

References

External links

1980 films
1980 documentary films
Canadian documentary films
Films shot in Greater Sudbury
Documentary films about mining
Documentary films about women
Documentary films about the labor movement
Women in Ontario
1980s Canadian films
1980s English-language films
1980s French-language films
1980 multilingual films
Canadian multilingual films